The commemorative coins of Netherlands are minted by the KNM (the Royal Dutch Mint)

The value of a Dutch silver coin corresponds with the theme of the coin. If the coin has a royal theme, then the face value is 10 euro. Any other subject and the coin will be of face value 5 euro.
The same principle with the gold coins, which have face values of 10 euro and 20 euro. Sometimes also 50 euro gold coins are issued.

2002

2003

2004

2005

2006

2007

2008

2009

References 

 Herdenkingsmunt (Commemorative coins) 
 Royal Dutch Mint 

Netherlands
Currency lists
Coins of the Netherlands